On Day One is an educational campaign designed to enhance understanding among the American public and alert candidates for office of the need and potential for international cooperation in addressing key global challenges.

Affiliation
On Day One is a project within the Better World Campaign (BWC), a nonpartisan organization that works to strengthen the relationship between the United States and the United Nations through outreach, communications, and advocacy. BWC was started by the Better World Fund which together with the United Nations Foundation, is a product of entrepreneur and philanthropist Ted Turner’s historic $1 billion gift to support UN causes.

How it works
Using an online media platform, On Day One is designed to gather and share ideas about what the next president can do on the first day of his or her administration to help address the world's most pressing challenges. From climate change, terrorism, poverty to the spread of disease, On Day One encourages regular citizens to be part of a global conversation about how international cooperation can be harnesses to address the world’s most critical dilemmas. On Day One contributors have included:

Nobel Peace Prize Winner Muhammad Yunus
Ambassador Joseph Wilson 
Former EPA Administrator Carol Browner
Washington Note Columnist Steve Clemons
Former White House Chief of Staff John Podesta
Former Senator and Presidential Candidate Mike Gravel
Former State Department Chief of Staff Col. Lawrence Wilkerson
Ambassador Thomas Pickering
Congresswoman Barbara Lee

References

External links
On Day One
Better World Campaign
United Nations Foundation

United States educational programs